The 8th Infantry Division (8-ya Pekhotnaya Diviziya) was an infantry formation of the Russian Imperial Army that existed in various formations from the early 19th century until the end of World War I and the Russian Revolution. The division was based in Warsaw in the years leading up to 1914. It fought in World War I and was demobilized in 1918.

Organization 
Russian infantry divisions consisted of a staff, two infantry brigades and one artillery brigade. The 8th Infantry Division was part of the 15th Army Corps.
1st Brigade (HQ Warsaw):  
29th Chernigov Infantry Regiment
30th Poltava Infantry Regiment
2nd Brigade (HQ Warsaw):
31st Aleksopol Infantry Regiment 
32nd Kremenchug Infantry Regiment
8th Artillery Brigade

Rank insignia

Officer ranks

Non-commissioned officers and enlisted ranks

Commanders (Division Chiefs) 
1834-1849: Fedor Panyutin
1905: Nikolai Grigorievich Mikhailov
1906-1907: Eduard Ekk
1909: Evgeny Emilievich Fitingof (baron)

References 

Infantry divisions of the Russian Empire
Military units and formations established in 1806
Military units and formations disestablished in 1918
Warsaw Governorate